The Big Horn Hotel, on Main St. in Arminto, Wyoming, was built in 1906.  It was listed on the National Register of Historic Places in 1978.

The hotel was built in 1906 in Wolton, Wyoming, and was moved to Arminto in 1913 when the Chicago, Burlington and Quincy Railroad (later Burlington Northern) came through Arminto.

It was moved by 30 teams of horses and mules according to some reports, or by 16 horses according to another.

The hotel was destroyed by fire on February 17, 1985.

Research materials about the hotel were archived at the University of Wyoming in Laramie.

References

External links
Railhead:Arminto, including photo of site where hotel was located

Hotel buildings on the National Register of Historic Places in Wyoming
Hotel buildings completed in 1906
Natrona County, Wyoming
Hotels in Wyoming
1906 establishments in Wyoming
1985 disestablishments in Wyoming
Buildings and structures demolished in 1985